Leland Blane Chapman (born December 14, 1976) is an American bail bondsman and bounty hunter, known as one of the stars of the A&E Network reality television program Dog the Bounty Hunter. He also starred in the Country Music Television television documentary Dog and Beth: On the Hunt.

Early life
Chapman was born as son of Duane Chapman Sr. and his first wife, La Fonda Sue Darnall (née Honeycutt). 

Chapman spent his early years in Pampa, Texas, but during his teen years, moved to Colorado Springs, Colorado. As a teenager Chapman ran away from home, began skipping school, and joined a gang. Unable to handle him any longer, his mother put him in foster care, although he ran away and he was placed in a boys care home at 13. He was given the choice to go back into foster care or go live with his father and he chose to live with his father. 

At seventeen, Chapman began training in boxing and mixed martial arts with the help of his good friend Sonny Westbrook (who has appeared many times on Dog the Bounty Hunter). Leland graduated from high school when he was 18.

Career
Chapman started out working for his father at their family's bail bonds company, Da Kine Bail Bonds. Other family members working for the company include Beth Chapman, Duane Lee Chapman, and "Baby" Lyssa Chapman (Dog's daughter/Leland's half-sister), among others. 
On September 14, 2006, Leland Chapman was arrested along with Duane "Dog" Chapman and Tim Chapman by U.S. Marshals at the request of the Mexican government and was to be extradited to Mexico to face charges of "deprivation of liberty". The charges stem from an incident in which they were chasing fugitive and serial rapist Andrew Luster, the Max Factor Cosmetics heir. They captured Luster on June 18, 2003 in Puerto Vallarta, Mexico. Shortly after the capture, the three were themselves arrested by Puerto Vallarta police officers; the three posted bail but never returned to Mexico for their court hearing on July 15, 2003. They were released from custody on bail; Leland and Tim Chapman's bail was set at $100,000 each, while Dog's was set at $300,000. They faced an extradition hearing to Mexico, under the terms of treaties between the United States and Mexico. On the August 4, 2007 episode of Larry King Live, it was announced that the Mexican government had dropped the charges filed against the three bounty hunters. 

Chapman, along with his brothers, Duane Lee and Wesley Chapman, formed Chapbros Media. The company launched an iPhone, iPod Touch and website talent contest application called, "Show Off". The company is no longer in business (blog has not been updated since 2009).

The March 21, 2012 episode depicted Duane Lee telling Beth, "You want me fired, you gotta fire me," after which Chapman stated that he was quitting too. In 2012, the two brothers publicly stated that they left the show. In a tweet from Beth she wrote, "It will take 6 weeks to get thru the whole thing tonight's jus [sic] the beginning".

Since leaving the show Leland Chapman operates his own bail bond company, Kama'aina Bail Bonds on the Big Island of Hawaii and runs his father's business, Da Kine Bail Bonds in Oahu. He previously headed Bounty Hunter Tactical Supply Co. after Duane Lee moved to Florida.

In April 2013, Duane "Dog" Chapman's new television show, Dog and Beth: On the Hunt, debuted on CMT. The show features Dog, Beth, and Leland traveling across the country giving bail bondsmen business advice and assisting them with bounties. The pilot episode featured Chapman and Dog working together for the first time since the split in 2012.

Leland moved from Hawaii to Alabama in 2015. In July 2021, he moved back to the Big Island (Hawaii).

References

External links
 Leland Chapman Profile on Country Music Television
 Official Business Website |url-status=dead
 

1976 births
Bounty hunters
Living people
people from Carson County, Texas